Rouge-Perriers is a commune in the Eure department in the northern French region of Normandy.

Population

See also
Communes of the Eure department

References

Communes of Eure